Tomio is a masculine Japanese given name.

Possible writings
Tomio can be written using different combinations of kanji characters. Some examples:

富雄, "enrich, masculine"
富男, "enrich, man"
富夫, "enrich, husband"
冨雄, "enrich, masculine"
冨男, "enrich, man"
冨夫, "enrich, husband"
斗巳雄, "Big Dipper, sign of the snake (Chinese zodiac), masculine"

The name can also be written in hiragana とみお or katakana トミオ.

Notable people with the name
 , Japanese film actor
 , Japanese historian
 , Japanese sprinter
 , Japanese karateka
 , Japanese photographer
 , Japanese diver
 , Japanese mathematician
 , Japanese professor at Osaka University
 , Japanese educator
 , American businessman
, Japanese rower
 , Czech-Japanese politician and entrepreneur
, Japanese cross-country skier
 , Japanese triple jumper
 , Japanese alpine skier
 , Japanese sprint canoer
 , Japanese baseball player
, Japanese ice hockey player

Places
Tomio Building and Tomio Department Store, Little Tokyo, Los Angeles

See also
 Tomio Station, a railway station in Nara Prefecture, Japan

Japanese masculine given names